Kanjari Boriyavi Junction railway station is a railway station on the Western Railway network in the state of Gujarat, India. It is located in Kanjari, Kheda district of Gujarat, India. Kanjari Boriyavi Junction railway station is 8 km far away from Anand railway station and 11 km far away from Nadiad railway station. Passenger, MEMU and few Express trains halt at Kanjari Boriyavi Junction railway station. Kanjari Boriyavi Junction railway station is also connected to Vadtal by rail.

About Kanjari Boriyavi Junction

Name of railway station is Kanjari Boriyavi Junction because of following reasons:
 Railway station is located near the border of Kheda District and Anand District.
 Kanjari village is located in Kheda district, whereas Boriyavi village is located in Anand district.
 Railway station is Junction railway station because of "Vadtal Line".

Nearby Stations 

Anand is nearest railway station towards Vadodara, whereas Uttarsanda is nearest railway station towards Ahmedabad.

Trains 

Following Express trains halt at Kanjari Boriyavi Junction railway station in both direction:

 19033/34 Gujarat Queen
 19215/16 Saurashtra Express
 19035/36 Vadodara–Ahmedabad Intercity Express
 22953/54 Gujarat Express

Vadtal trains

 59163/64 Anand–Vadtal Swami Narayan Passenger
 59169/70 Anand–Vadtal Swami Narayan Passenger

See also
 Kheda district
 Anand district

References

Railway stations in Kheda district
Vadodara railway division
Railway junction stations in Gujarat